Newtonville/Steeves Field Aerodrome  is a registered aerodrome located  east of Newtonville, Ontario, Canada.

References

Transport in Clarington
Airports in the Regional Municipality of Durham